Rawal is a village in Mathura district of Mahavan Tehsil, Uttar Pradesh, India and there are about 409 families living here and it is a small village which is situated in the foothills of river Yamuna. 

Member of parliament Hema Malini has adopted the village under the Sansad Adarsh Gram Yojana announced by Prime Minister of India.

Demography
The residents or natives of Rawal and surroundings are called Brijwasi. The village had a population of 2753 at the time of the 2011 census of India.

Geography
Rawal village on the east bank of Yamuna river, which is  distant.

Education

Schools
 Prathmik Vidyalaya Rawal

Colleges

Transportation

Rail
Mathura Railway Junction

Road
Rawal Village is well connected to Mathura - Baldev Road.

Nearby villages

Cities 

 Aligarh
 Khair
 Mathura
 Noida
 Vrindavan
 Hodal
 Hathras
 Bajna
 Raya
 Surir

Villages & town 

 Bhidauni
 Auhawa Bangar
 Kewat Nagla
 Shihavan Bangar
 Bhadanwara
 Bera, Mathura
 Karahari

References

Villages in Mathura district